Joe Silver (September 28, 1922 – February 27, 1989) was an American stage, television, film and radio actor. His distinctive deep voice was once described as "the lowest voice in show business; so low that when he speaks, he unties your shoelaces."

Biography
He was born on September 28, 1922 in Chicago. He was raised in Green Bay, Wisconsin and attended Green Bay East High School and the University of Wisconsin.

Silver made his Broadway debut in 1942 in a revival of Tobacco Road. He was in the original production of Gypsy: A Musical Fable (1959) and was nominated for a Tony Award as a supporting actor for playing nine different roles in Lenny (1971).

In 1947, he made the first of more than 1,000 appearances on television, as a panelist on What's It Worth. Two years later, he became a member of the cast of the CBS educational children's television show Mr. I. Magination. In 1950, he appeared on the short-lived variety show Joey Faye's Frolics. He was featured on The Red Buttons Show in the 1950s, and was the second Captain Jet, host of the children's show Space Funnies in the late 1950s. He played the husband of star Lee Grant's character on Fay in the 1975-1976 season.

His film credits include Diary of a Bachelor (1964), Move (1970), Rhinoceros (1974), The Apprenticeship of Duddy Kravitz (1974), Shivers (1975), Rabid (1977), You Light Up My Life (1977), Crash (1978), Boardwalk (1979), Deathtrap (1982), Almost You (1985) and Switching Channels (1988). He also provided the voice of the ox in the 1970 Christmas special The Night the Animals Talked and as The Creep in the horror anthology film Creepshow 2 (1987). He also provided the speaking and singing voices of the Greedy in Raggedy Ann & Andy: A Musical Adventure (1977).

Silver's last performance was in the musical Legs Diamond. While suffering from liver cancer, Silver died in Manhattan after suffering a heart attack at the age of 66 on February 27, 1989. He was survived by his actress wife Chevi Colton, their son Christopher, their daughter Jennifer, and three grandchildren.

Filmography

References

External links

1922 births
1989 deaths
American male film actors
American male stage actors
American male television actors
Male actors from Chicago
Male actors from New York City
20th-century American male actors
Deaths from cancer in New York (state)
Deaths from liver cancer
Green Bay East High School alumni
University of Wisconsin–Madison alumni